Martine Dessureault (born 2 March 1974) is a Canadian former swimmer who represented Canada at the 1996 Summer Olympic Games.

Career 

Dessureault was born in Montreal, Quebec. She was trained by Éric Kramer. At the 1996 Summer Olympic Games Dessureault finished 26th out of 55 swimmers in the women's 50 metre freestyle with a time of 26.44 seconds.

References

1974 births
Living people
Olympic swimmers of Canada
Swimmers at the 1996 Summer Olympics
Swimmers from Montreal
Canadian female freestyle swimmers
20th-century Canadian women
21st-century Canadian women